Freedom Alliance can refer to various political and ideological groups and movements, including: 

 Freedom Alliance Party of Liberia
 United People's Freedom Alliance, a political alliance in Sri Lanka (2004–2019)
 Sri Lanka People's Freedom Alliance, a political alliance in Sri Lanka
 University of Maryland, Baltimore County, Freedom Alliance
 Freedom Alliance Party of Fiji
 Freedom Alliance, far-right party in Finland
 Freedom Alliance (United Kingdom), a British anti-lockdown political party during the coronavirus pandemic